Dolgoma recta is a moth of the family Erebidae. It is found in Thailand.

References

Moths described in 2009
Dolgoma